North Delhi Municipal Corporation Medical College, established in 2013, is a full-fledged tertiary Medical college at Malka Ganj in Delhi, India. The college imparts the degree of Bachelor of Medicine and Surgery (MBBS). The college is recognized by National Medical Commission and is affiliated with the Guru Gobind Singh Indraprastha University. The selection to the college is done on the basis of merit through National Eligibility and Entrance Test. This college is associated with the Hindu Rao Hospital, the largest multi-specialty hospital run by the Delhi Municipal Corporation.

Courses
North Delhi Municipal Corporation Medical College undertakes the education and training of students in MBBS courses.

References

External links 
http://www.northmcd.com/medicalcollege/

Medical colleges in Delhi
Educational institutions established in 2013
Hospitals in Delhi